National parks of Honduras is a list of the National parks in Honduras.

National parks

References

Instituto Nacional de Conservaciòn y Desarrollo Forestal, Areas Protegidas y Vida Silvestre  (ICF). [2009]. Alcances importantes obtenidos desde el año 2006 hasta la fecha.
mapa interactivo de los Parques Nacionales de Honduras. INFOHN.COM

Honduras

National parks
National parks